Lichelle Laws (born September 12, 1969), better known by her stage name Boss, is an American rapper from Detroit, Michigan. Her debut album, Born Gangstaz, reached number three on Billboard's Top R&B/Hip-Hop Albums chart in 1993. Her name is sometimes stylized as Bo$$.

Personal life and career 
Laws was born in Detroit to Joe Laws, an autoworker, and Lillie, who took her master's degree in education, Detroit, and was a teacher at junior high and middle schools, formerly a teacher of business education at Lewis College of Business, Detroit. Her parents were both church deacons. She has two elder sisters. Laws relocated to Los Angeles after graduating high school, accompanied by her DJ Irene 'Dee' Moore. She was spotted by DJ Quik who stuck her on a track with AMG. Russell Simmons liked the track and promptly signed her to Def Jam West. Her debut album Born Gangstaz was released in 1993, and the singles, "Deeper" and "Recipe for a Hoe", hit number one on the Billboard Hot Rap Tracks chart.

In 1994, Laws was interviewed by a reporter from The Wall Street Journal, who revealed that she grew up in a middle-class neighborhood (on the West Side, Detroit), studied ballet and piano, and attended Catholic private school (where she was a cheerleader), before majoring in business for two years at Oakland University. Laws had never attempted to disguise the truth of her upbringing; the intro of her 1993 album Born Gangstaz, "Intro: A Call From Mom", has her mother Lillie describe her as "a young lady who was brought up through Catholic school for 12 years; and dance schools, tap dance, jazz, piano lessons and all of that; plus, you went to college for three years...." "The album is, in fact, bracketed with a mockery of her rearing; phone messages from mama and papa particularizing a privileged suburban upbringing (Catholic-school, piano-playing, tap-dancing)" belying the record's "unyielding vulgarity and embroidered aggression" with a "brilliant... self-mocking disclaimer". Def Jef, who produced the album and suggested the inclusion of Laws's parents, observed "I can't believe none of the reviews saw the irony of that. No one did!" Having left Detroit for south-side Los Angeles in 1990, Laws and Moore encountered its "squalid side... derelict hotels, feudal gangs, dealing and hustling". Prior to securing a record deal, they lived in poor circumstances, selling drugs, sleeping on benches, and living in low-rent hotels. Her parents were unaware of the lifestyle she was leading.  In the wake of her first album, Laws and Moore stopped working together, Laws noting "We couldn't work together anymore, but we were still cool"; Moore's Def Jam deal never came to anything.

In the mid-1990s, Laws relocated to Texas to record songs with Ricardo Royal, a.k.a. "Coco Budda", a rapper whose work she had admired; Laws settled in Houston, they entered a relationship, and had a son, Lamar. Although living a more relaxed life, Laws recorded demos for a second album, funded by Def Jam, but the label rejected them, and she was dropped from the label. Laws took this development in stride, noting "I was used to that kind of shit... I thought I was good enough to get another deal. But I just chilled in Texas. Then I got sick." Still performing shows despite waning popularity in light of her lack of new releases, Laws moved to Dallas with Royal, where she took a job as co-host of a nightly hip-hop radio show on KKDA-FM, where she stayed for five years, recalling in 2004 "that was a bomb job". By 1999, she was suffering kidney failure; she and Royal amicably split up, and she went to live with her parents, undergoing dialysis for three and a half years, experiencing "every complication that you have with... bad kidneys", and given a poor prognosis. At times of comparatively better health, Laws recorded with Def Jef, who praised her dedication, lack of self-pity, and resolve in the face of her health problems. In 2001, she collaborated with Krayzie Bone on his album Thug On Da Line. In 2004, she released a mixtape titled The Six Million Dollar Mixtape produced by Def Jef. In 2004, Laws observed of her more recent work "It's still hardcore... it's me. I've been through so much. I try to put a message in there, but it's not preachy shit." Def Jef claimed to have "shopped (Laws) to almost every major and indie label and met with resistance... People are always asking about how she looks, what her age is... it's never about the music. I'll work with Boss when she's 45 years old. She gave me a new perspective on women."

It was revealed in May 2011 that Laws was in need of a kidney due to her suffering from renal disease, a disease that rendered her kidneys useless for processing toxins in her body. Laws reached out to the Facebook community for a potential donor. A donor is yet to be found. In 2017, Laws suffered from "a major stroke and seizure", and on 31 January 2021 a GoFundMe was set up to raise $15,000 for a recommended medical procedure. By February 17, the NME reported it had reached $2,215; by March 3, it had surpassed the $15,000 goal, reaching $16,314.

Discography

Studio albums

Collaboration albums
Doin Everythang with D.E.T. (2008)

Singles

Songs in soundtracks
Boss' song "I Don't Give A Fuck" featured as the Closing Credits song of the episode "Lesbian Request Denied" from Season 1 of the Netflix TV show Orange Is the New Black.

Boss' song "I Don't Give A Fuck" featured as the Closing Credits song of the episode "Under Pressure" from Season 1 of the Showtime TV show Man Who Fell From the Sky.

References

1969 births
Living people
American women rappers
African-American women rappers
Midwest hip hop musicians
Rappers from Detroit
Def Jam Recordings artists
Gangsta rappers
21st-century American rappers
21st-century American women musicians
21st-century African-American women
21st-century African-American musicians
20th-century African-American people
20th-century African-American women
21st-century women rappers